Josephine Eusebio Constantino-Asuncion (born December 4, 1988), professionally known as Yeng Constantino, is a Filipino pop rock singer-songwriter, occasional actress  and host. She is referred to as the Philippines Pop Rock Royalty and is regarded as one of the biggest hitmakers in Philippine music industry. In 2006, she won the title "Grand Star Dreamer" in the inaugural season of Pinoy Dream Academy, the Philippine edition of Endemol's reality TV show Star Academy. Her debut album titled Salamat became the biggest selling album of her career being 3× Platinum in the Philippines and produced five #1 hits and six top 10 hits, the most by any female artist. Constantino has sold an estimated of over 400,000 copies of her albums in the Philippines. Metro Society listed her as one of the most influential in social media.

Metro Style listed her as one of the most influential social media personalities in the Philippines. She is also one of the most followed female Filipino celebrities on Instagram as of 2020. CNN Philippines listed the iconic hit Hawak Kamay at number 12 as one of the Best Filipino Love Songs of the last 25 years. Yeng also starred in a film Write About Love and took home the Best Supporting Actress Award in MMFF 2019, an affirmation of her acting prowess. As of July 2021, Yeng has over 292 million career streams on Spotify, becoming one of the Most Streamed Filipino artists of all time and has over 32 million accumulated views on her official YouTube channel with over a million subscribers as well. Her timeless hit Ikaw is also listed as the second most viewed OPM music video by a Female Filipino solo artist and 6th overall as of May 2021.

Personal life
Constantino is the youngest of five siblings in the Constantino family. She is a second cousin of television host and Pinoy Big Brother: Teen Edition Plus second big placer Robi Domingo. Her family was raised as a born-again Christian.

By June 2013, Constantino began a relationship with Victor "Yan" Asuncion, a fellow musician and worship director at Victory Christian Fellowship. In March 2014, after nine months of dating, Constantino announced her engagement to Asuncion through an Instagram post. On February 14, 2015, the couple married at a resort in Tagaytay, Cavite. Since September 2015, both Constantino and Asuncion went on vegan diets.

In 2022, it was revealed that Constantino was romantically linked to Korean-born Filipino television personality Ryan Bang in 2010.

Career

2006–07: Pinoy Dream Academy, career beginnings and Hawak Kamay
On August 27, 2006, Yeng Constantino auditioned for the inaugural season of the singing competition Pinoy Dream Academy. In December, Constantino won the competition after garnering 697,648 votes (37.32%), becoming the first "Grand Star Dreamer", followed by Jay-R Siaboc as the first runner-up.

After winning, Star Music launched Constantino's debut album entitled Salamat, containing 10 songs, seven of which were original compositions by Constantino. Her album reached Gold Record status two weeks after its release and then later went Platinum after a month, followed by a "3× Platinum Record" certification several months later.

After the success of her multi-platinum debut album, Star Music produced Constantino's second album. On February 28, 2008, her second album, Journey was launched. The carrier single is "Ikaw Lang Talaga". The album contains 12 tracks, some of which were written by Yeng herself. The album reached Gold status after several months.

Sometime in November 2008, Constantino became a member of the all-female group Y.R.S., a group composed of Constantino, Rachelle Ann Go and Sarah Geronimo that was a segment of ASAP '08 until it's disbandment in March/April 2010 following Go's transfer to GMA Network.

2009–12: Lapit and Yeng Versions Live
Lapit, her third studio album, was released digitally via Star Records' official website on October 9, 2009, then later released in physical format in music stores in the Philippines; a week later, the album was pulled due to some technical errors in the album tracklisting and was re-released before its grand album launch on November 1, 2009. Lapit went on to receive Platinum status.

In March 2010, Constantino began her first regular television hosting stint as co-host of Music Uplate Live, a late-night musical variety show, along with Tutti Caringal, Gee Canlas, and Martin Concio. The show aired on ABS-CBN until September 2011.

On October 5, 2011, Star Records released her first live album, entitled Yeng Versions Live, on which she sings 80's and 90's OPM hits. It was commercially successful and achieved Platinum status shortly after its release.

2013: Transformation and Metamorphosis
She released her fourth studio album entitled Metamorphosis on January 28, 2013. Its first single, "B.A.B.A.Y", was released to radio stations on January 9. The music video for the second single, "Chinito", premiered on May 24 on Myx Channel. It features Filipino actor Enchong Dee as Constantino's love interest. The third single, "Sandata", was released on July 3, 2013.

In November 2013, Yeng released her international single "Better Than Yesterday," a pop song featuring prominent drums and rap courtesy of Singaporean rapper, actor and radio personality Sheikh Haikel. The track was produced by Shorya Sharma.

The album reached Gold in December 2014.

2014–15: All About Love and The Voice Kids
She released her fifth album, All About Love, which was her attempt to tackle new genres beyond her pop-rock image. It was released on iTunes on October 30, 2014, and on CD on November 27, 2014. The music video for the first single, "Ikaw", premiered on August 30 on Myx Channel, which also served as a prenuptial with her then-fiancé Yan Asuncion. On December 13, 2015, the album was awarded with Gold and Platinum awards on ASAP for reaching 15,000 sold copies.

In May 2015, Constantino announced that she would co-host the second season of The Voice Kids, alongside Luis Manzano and her cousin Robi Domingo, replacing Alex Gonzaga. The season aired on ABS-CBN from June 6 to August 30, 2015.

2016: Tenth year celebrations
In 2016, Constantino was announced to be one of the mentors of the reality show We Love OPM: The Celebrity Sing-Offs, which ran from May 14 – July 17, 2016. Her team is named Oh My Girls, which was composed of Ylona Garcia, Krissha Viaje and Alexa Ilacad. Oh My Girls placed second overall throughout the entire show's run.

In May 2015, Constantino announced plans to release a musical in 2016 that would feature her discography from the past years to celebrate her tenth year in the music industry. It was titled Ako Si Josephine.

Later in 2016, Constantino joined the judging panel of ABS-CBN's reality singing competition show Pinoy Boyband Superstar, along with Vice Ganda, Aga Muhlach and Sandara Park.

2016-2020: DIVAS
On April 27, 2016, Constantino was announced to be part of the girl group DIVAS, along with Kyla, KZ Tandingan and Angeline Quinto (Rachelle Ann Go was originally going to also be part of the group, but left due to international commitments).

On November 11, 2016, the group staged their first concert, entitled DIVAS Live in Manila, at the Smart Araneta Coliseum.

In 2018, the group held their second concert at the Smart Araneta Coliseum on December 15, 2018, with Boyz II Men, entitled Boyz II Men with DIVAS.

2018 - Synesthesia
In 2018, Constantino released her sixth studio album titled Synesthesia. The album spawned four singles "Pinipigil" and the hit single "Ako Muna" the song is a pop ballad and an emotional and self-empowering anthem. Constantino performed the song live on Wish 107.5 bus and it earned 7.2 million views on YouTube and she also performed the song in It's Showtime, the song became a radio hit in the Philippines and peaked at number six on the Myx Daily Top Ten music videos chart, and number ten on the MOR Pinoy Biga10 radio chart, the song also played in the radio in the United Kingdom with six spin and in the Sweden, the music video of "Ako Muna" was released in March 2018 on YouTube the music video was directed by Miguel Alomajan, it earned 9.8 million views on YouTube. Two more singles on the album released:"Tahimik" and "Dasal."

Artistry

Influences
Her early influences include Canadian superstars Alanis Morissette and Avril Lavigne; country music singers LeAnn Rimes, Martina McBride and Trisha Yearwood; pop punk/rock bands the Ataris, Blink 182, Sum 41, The Starting Line, Coheed and Cambria, Yellowcard and Sandwich; and Filipina rock singers Acel Bisa, Kitchie Nadal and Barbie Almalbis.

In November 2014, she admitted on her website that she was a fan of contemporary stars Demi Lovato, Taylor Swift, Hayley Williams and Avril Lavigne.

In 2018, Yeng started her own YouTube vlog, she often shows her admiration to Mariah Carey.

Filmography

Television/Digital

Film
 2020: You Animal (Voice Actress)
 2019: Write About Love (Joyce)
 2018: The Eternity Between Seconds (Sam)
 2013: Shift (Estela)
 2012: Kimmy Dora & The Temple Of Kiyeme (cameo)

Discography

Studio albums
2007: Salamat
2008: Journey
2009: Lapit
2013: Metamorphosis
2014: All About Love
2018: Synesthesia

Live albums
2011: Yeng Versions Live

Compilation albums
2006: Pinoy Dream Academy Originals (Volume 1)
2006: Pinoy Dream Academy Originals (Volume 2)
2006: Pinoy Dream Academy Originals (Volume 3)
2006: Pinoy Dream Academy Originals (Volume 4)
2007: Star Magic Christmas Album
2007: Judy Ann Santos: Musika ng Buhay Ko
2007: Nagmamahal Kapamilya Album
2008: My Girl OST Album
2008: Musika at Pelikula
2010: 60 Taon ng Musika at Soap Opera Album
2010: i-star 15 Anniversary Collection (The Best of TV and Movie Themes)
2010: Ngayong Pasko Magniningning ang Pilipino (Christmas Songs Compilation)
2011: OPM Number 1's Vol. 2
2011: Bida Best Hits Da Best Album
2011: Da Best ang Pasko ng Pilipino Album
2012: OPM Number 1's Vol. 3
2012: The Reunion An Eraserheads Tribute Album
2013: Himig Handog P-Pop Lovesongs Album
2014: The Next Step Vol. 2 Album (Academy of Rock)
2014: Star Cinema 20th Commemorative Album
2014: Transforming Love Album (CBN Asia)

Awards and recognition

2021

• PMPC: 12th Star Awards for music — Rock Artist of the Year

2018
 Paragala: The Central Luzon Media Awards 2018 – Best Female Recording Artist
 Bulacan State University Batarisang Awards – Batarisang Pangmusika
 Metro Society – Most Influential People on Social Media
 3rd Wish 107.5 Music Awards- Wishclusive Elite Circle  Bronze Awardee
 3rd GIC Innovative Award for Television – Most Innovative TV Singer

2017
 7th EdukCircle Awards – Female Music Artist of the Year
 Golden Laurel LPU Batangas Media Awards – Best Female Singer

2016
 Anak TV Awards 2016 – Female Makabata Star
 Wish 107.5 Music Awards 2016 Best WISHclusive Performance by a Female Artist “Ikaw” – Yeng Constantino
 Push Awards 2016 Digital Media  Pushlike Female Celebrity
 Push Awards 2016 Digital Media Pushtweet Music Artist
 Push Awards 2016 Digital Media Pushplay Female Celebrity
 Push Awards 2016 Digital Media Push Elite
 MYX Music Awards 2016: Favorite Mellow Video – Dance Without the Music – Yeng Constantino

2015
 Alta Media Icon Awards 2015 – Best Music Video: Ikaw – Yeng Constantino
 28th Awit Awards 2015 – Song of the Year: Ikaw – Yeng Constantino/Star Music
 2015 PMPC Star Awards for Music – Song of the Year: Ikaw – Yeng Constantino/Star Music
 Digital Push Awards 2015 – Push Tweet Favorite Music Artist
 Digital Push Awards 2015 – Push Gram Most Loved Music Artist
 Digital Push Awards 2015 – Push Play Best Music Artist

2014
 Star Cinema Online Awards 2014 "Favorite Star Cinema Movie Themesong: Chinito"
 Internet Gateway's Most Downloaded Artist for 2013
 Internet Gateway's Most Downloaded Song 2013: Chinito
 MYX Music Awards 2014: "Favorite Female Artist"
 MOR Pinoy Music Awards 2014: "Song of the Year: Chinito"

2013
 Named as Academy of Rock's Ambassadress
 Rock School London: Honorary Licentiate Diploma
 MYX Music Awards 2013: "Favorite Female Artist"
 PMPC Star Awards for Music 2013: "Rock Album of the Year" – "Metamorphosis"
 PMPC Star Awards for Music 2013: "Music Video of the Year" – "Chinito"

2012
 MYX Music Awards 2012: "Favorite Female Artist"
 PMPC Star Awards for Music 2012: "Female Rock Artist of the Year"

2011
 MYX Music Awards 2011: "Favorite Music Video" – "Jeepney Love Story"
 MYX Music Awards 2011: "Favorite Song" – "Jeepney Love Story"
 MYX Music Awards 2011: "Favorite Female Artist"
 MYX Music Awards 2011: "Favorite Collaboration" – "Kung Wala Na Nga – 6cyclemind Feat. Kean Cipriano & Yeng Constantino"
 MYX Music Awards 2011: "Favorite Myx Celebrity VJ"
 ASAP 24K Gold Award – "Yeng Versions Live"

2010
 Tambayan 101.9 OPM Awards 2010: "Female Artist of the Year"
 Awit Awards 2010: "Texters' Choice Song of the Year" – "Lapit"
 PMPC Star Awards for Music 2010: "Album of the Year" – "Lapit"

2009
 Philippine Digital Music Awards 2009: "Best Female Artist"
 1st Waki OPM Awards 2009 – "Album of the Year"
 Star Magic 3rd Annual Ball 2009 – "Most Fashion Forward"
 ASAP 24K Gold Award – "Journey" Album

2008
 Pop Music Video ("Himig ng Pag-Ibig"): ASAP Pop Viewer's Choice Awards 2008
 Awit Awards 2008: "People's Choice Favorite Song of the Year" – "Salamat"
 Awit Awards 2008: "People's Choice FAvorite Music Video" – "Time-In"

2007
 Compilation Awardee ("Nagmamahal Kapamilya Album"): 3rd ASAP Platinum Circle Awards
 Female Awardee ("Salamat"): 3rd ASAP Platinum Circle Awards
 Best New Artist: 2007 Aliw Awards
 Favorite New Artist: 1st OPM Songhits 2007 Awards
 Top 40 Brand Award: 1st OPM Songhits 2007 Awards
 Best Theme Song (Kasal Kasali Kasalo's "Hawak Kamay"): 55th FAMAS Awards 2007
 Breakthrough Artist: 1st OPM Songhits Awards 2007
 Hitmaker Of The Year: Yeng Constantino (7 hit songs for the year 2007): 1st Megamixx Radio Music Awards (Guam)
 Most Popular Song by a Duo ("If we fall in love" with RJ Jimenez): 2nd IFM Pinoy Music Awards

See also
 Pinoy Dream Academy
 ABS-CBN
 Star Music
 ASAP
 Star Magic

References

External links
 
 Yeng's Video and News
 Yeng Constantino's profile at ABS-CBN.com Beta
 Yeng Constantino's Lucena City Album Tour 
 Yeng Constantino's Live Chat event – Journey, An Album Launch

 
1988 births
21st-century Filipino women singers
Filipino evangelicals
Living people
Pinoy Dream Academy participants
People from Rodriguez, Rizal
Singers from Rizal
Star Magic
Star Academy winners
ABS-CBN personalities
Star Music artists